Alphabet City is a 1984 American crime drama film directed by Amos Poe. The story follows a young New York City gangster of Italian descent named Johnny, who has been given control over his own neighborhood by the Mafia. Then unknown actors Vincent Spano (as Johnny), Jami Gertz, and Michael Winslow give compelling performances in this low-budget crime/drama/thriller.  Acclaimed film and stage actress Zohra Lampert plays Johnny's mother.  The film is set in Alphabet City, a part of the East Village in New York City.

Plot 
The film takes place entirely in one evening, with the time being indicated chronologically on the clock in Johnny's Trans Am. Johnny, a working-class Italian-American from Alphabet City, works for the New York Italian-American Mafia, which has placed him in charge of running organized crime operations and rackets in his neighborhood, including drug dealing operations and the collection of protection money, debts, and street taxes and kick-ups from other local gangsters.

Early in the evening, Johnny meets with his friend Lippy, an eccentric cocaine dealer played by Michael Winslow. They discuss the planned arson of an Alphabet City tenement building, as ordered by the Mafia. As their discussion progresses, it becomes clear that it is Johnny who must carry out the burning of the building before the night is over, and, moreover, that his impoverished mother and sister live in the targeted building.  This request from the Mob pushes Johnny to plan a split from the Mob, which proves difficult. By the end of the night, Johnny must save his sister and mother from the burning of their building and also rescue his girlfriend and their newborn child from the clutches of the Mob.

Cast 
 Vincent Spano as Johnny
 Michael Winslow as Lippy
 Kate Vernon as Angie
 Jami Gertz as Sophia
 Zohra Lampert as Mama
 Raymond Serra as Gino
 Kenny Marino as Tony
 Tom Mardirosian as Benny
 Clifton Powell as Ramon
 Tom Wright as Chauffeur

Music 
The music was composed by the prolific producer Nile Rodgers, famous for his work with acts such as Chic, Sister Sledge, and Madonna.

Vehicle 
The vehicle Vincent Spano drives in the film is a 1983 Pontiac Trans Am 25th Anniversary Daytona 500 Edition. Only 2500 of the cars were built.

References

External links 
 

1984 films
1984 crime drama films
Atlantic Entertainment Group films
American crime drama films
Films about the American Mafia
1980s English-language films
1980s American films